The William S. Ritchie Jr. Bridge, more commonly known as the Ravenswood Bridge, is a two-lane cantilever bridge in the United States, connecting Ravenswood, West Virginia and rural Meigs County, Ohio, across the Ohio River. The bridge was completed in 1981.

The bridge replaced a ferry that had crossed the river between Ravenswood at Walnut Street and rural Lebanon Township since at least 1908. When the bridge opened in 1981, on the Ohio side of the river, the bridge and its approach route carried the  Ohio State Route 824 (SR 824). The crossing originally led to a winding two-lane SR 338. On the West Virginia side, the bridge carried West Virginia Route 338. In 2003, the SR 824 and WV 338 designations were removed when the US 33 relocation in Meigs County was completed and the US 33 designation was moved onto the bridge.

See also
List of crossings of the Ohio River

References

External links

 Ravenswood Bridge at Bridges & Tunnels

Bridges completed in 1981
Road bridges in West Virginia
Buildings and structures in Jackson County, West Virginia
Buildings and structures in Meigs County, Ohio
Bridges over the Ohio River
Transportation in Jackson County, West Virginia
Transportation in Meigs County, Ohio
Road bridges in Ohio
Cantilever bridges in the United States
U.S. Route 33
Bridges of the United States Numbered Highway System
Interstate vehicle bridges in the United States